The Division of Goldstein is an Australian Electoral Division in Victoria. The division was created in 1984, when the former Division of Balaclava was abolished. It is located in the bayside suburbs of Melbourne, including Beaumaris, Bentleigh, Brighton, Caulfield South, Cheltenham (part), Glen Huntly (part), Elsternwick,  (part), Gardenvale and Sandringham.

Geography
Since 1984, federal electoral division boundaries in Australia have been determined at redistributions by a redistribution committee appointed by the Australian Electoral Commission. Redistributions occur for the boundaries of divisions in a particular state, and they occur every seven years, or sooner if a state's representation entitlement changes or when divisions of a state are malapportioned.

History

The division is named after Vida Goldstein, an early parliamentary candidate who contested five separate elections within the first two decades after Federation. It had historically been a safe seat for the Liberal Party; it and its predecessor seat of Balaclava has always gone to the Liberals and its predecessors. When combined, the seat is one of very few that has never been held by the Labor Party at any point since 1901.

Its most prominent members include Ian Macphee, a minister under Malcolm Fraser and prominent Liberal moderate; and Andrew Robb, a former federal director of the Liberal Party who served as a minister under John Howard, Tony Abbott and Malcolm Turnbull.

Members

Election results

References

External links
 Division of Goldstein - Australian Electoral Commission

Electoral divisions of Australia
Constituencies established in 1984
1984 establishments in Australia
City of Bayside
City of Glen Eira
Electoral districts and divisions of Greater Melbourne